Bangers is a 1999 Australian short film starring Cate Blanchett.  Her husband Andrew Upton wrote, produced, and directed the film.  It was their first collaboration from their production company "Dirty Films".  Bangers was later included in the 2005 compilation film Stories of Lost Souls.

Plot
Cate Blanchett portrays a marginally successful career woman preparing dinner for her gruff and unsympathetic mother.  As she cooks the mashed potatoes and sausages, she tells an indifferent audience of her mother and cat about a recent promotion at work.  While she rants about her job it becomes apparent that she is in the middle of a mental breakdown that culminates in burned sausage and mashed potatoes all over the floor.

Cast
 Cate Blanchett - Julie-Anne
 Lynette Curran - Mother
 Meggs the cat - Mr. Funnybones

References

External links

 Bangers at the National Film and Sound Archive
 page for the film it was included with

1999 films
Australian short films
1999 short films
1990s English-language films